"Innocent" is a single by British musician Mike Oldfield, released in 1989. It is from the album Earth Moving and features vocals from Anita Hegerland.

Inspiration 
According to an interview Mike Oldfield and Anita Hegerland gave in the TV-program Good Morning Britain, the song was inspired by their young daughter Greta; who also appears in the music video. In the program Oldfield and Hegerland gave an acoustic version of the song, Hegerland singing and Oldfield playing the guitar.

Music videos 
The music video features an Atari ST computer, a Korg M1 synthesiser and a Fender Stratocaster guitar and is available on the Elements – The Best of Mike Oldfield video. There is also a second part animated part live action video in existence.

Track listing 
 "Innocent" (12" mix) – 5:35
 "Innocent" – 3:25
 "Earth Moving" (disco version) – 4:02

Charts

Weekly charts

Year-end charts

Groove Coverage version

A version of the song was recorded and released as a single by German dance band Groove Coverage. The single was released digitally on 1 October 2010 in Germany as the lead single from their fourth studio album Riot on the Dancefloor. The song was written by Mike Oldfield and produced by Axel Konrad, Ole Wierk, Verena Rehm.

Music video
A music video to accompany the release of "Innocent" was first released onto YouTube on 20 September 2010 at a total length of three minutes and nine seconds.

Track listing

Chart performance

Release history

Other recorded versions 
 In 2010 Jason Donovan recorded a version of "Innocent" for his 1980s covers album Soundtrack of the 80s.

References 

1989 singles
Mike Oldfield songs
Songs written by Mike Oldfield
2010 singles
Groove Coverage songs
Virgin Records singles
1989 songs